Bad Boys Blue is the 1993 self-titled album from German Eurodance group Bad Boys Blue.

Track listing
"Save Your Love" - 3:58
"I Totally Miss You" - 3:57
"Have You Ever Had A Love Like This" - 3:35
"Come Back And Stay" - 3:58
"Show Me The Way" - 3:53
"A Train To Nowhere" - 3:51
"Under The Boardwalk" - 3:30
"Johnny" - 4:25
"I'm Never Gonna Fall In Love Again" - 3:50
"Rhythm Of The Night" - 3:55

Sales and certifications

References 

1993 albums
Zoo Entertainment (record label) albums